Andrew Palmer may refer to:
Andrew Palmer (politician) (1808–1891), American politician and newspaper publisher in Wisconsin
Andrew Palmer (diplomat) (1937–2019), British diplomat
Andrew Clennel Palmer (1938–2019), British engineer
N. A. Palmer (Andrew Palmer, born 1956), British punk musician and artist
Andy Palmer (born 1963), British engineer and Nissan executive
Andrew Palmer (climber), American rock climber
Andrew Palmer (racing driver) (born 1994), American racing driver